Hello Brother is a 1999 Indian Hindi-language romantic fantasy action film starring Salman Khan, Arbaaz Khan, Rani Mukerji and Shakti Kapoor. It was directed by Salman Khan's brother Sohail Khan. The film is an adaptation of 1992 Malayalam film Aayushkalam. Salman Khan’s character Hero, resembles the lead character in Pee-wee's Big Adventure. The Film received mixed to bad reviews. However it was a Box Office flop. The music of the movie received very good response that year.

Plot 

Hero (Salman Khan) works for a courier company owned by Khanna (Shakti Kapoor). He is spirited and humorous and is in love with Rani (Rani Mukerji) but she simply thinks of Hero as a very good friend. Enter Inspector Vishal (Arbaaz Khan) who works in the narcotics department. Vishal, who is stationed at a different Police Department, transfers to Mumbai/Goa. Vishal suspects Khanna to be involved in a drug ring and confronts him. Hero stands up to Vishal and defends his boss, but soon learns the truth behind Khanna. In a confrontation, Khanna kills Hero and shoots Vishal in the heart. The police department decides to transplant Hero's heart into Vishal's body.

Hero appears as a ghost now and can only be seen by Vishal, since his heart is in Vishal's body. Hero says that he will only rest in peace after Khanna is killed, thus avenging him. Vishal decides to go about doing this, and Rani and Vishal begin to fall in love with each other. Hero dislikes this and tries to foil Vishal's plans of getting close to Rani. But Hero and Vishal start getting closer and work together, becoming good friends after Vishal confronts Khanna's drug company.

Khanna arranges to leave the country but kidnaps Rani. Vishal and Hero go to save Rani and fight off Khanna's henchmen, but Vishal gets injured. Hero then goes inside him and controls his fighting moves, helping him to beat the thugs. Rani witnesses this and realizes that only Hero would do those kinds of moves. She calls out Hero's name, though Vishal does not know that Hero is inside him. Khanna shoots Vishal. Hero takes Vishal's hand and shoots Khanna with the gun.

Khanna finally dies, and as Rani is comforting Vishal, he tells her that Hero is with them and he loves Rani. Rani then tells Vishal to tell Hero that she loves Him. Khanna's ghost rises from his dead body and Hero hits him. Khanna is taken to Hell and Hero is taken to Heaven.

Afterward, Rani and Vishal have gotten married and are spending their wedding night and honeymoon in a house on the water. It is shown that Hero, now an angel, is happily watching over them from Heaven.

Cast 
 Salman Khan as Hero
 Arbaaz Khan as Inspector Vishal
 Rani Mukerji as Rani
 Shakti Kapoor as Khanna
 Johnny Lever as Havaldar Hatela
 Razak Khan as Ninja Chacha
 Neeraj Vora as Sr. Inspector
 Sulbha Arya as Rani's Mother
 Dinyar Tirandaz as Doctor
 Amitabh Bachchan as God voiceover only (cameo appearance)
 Ganesh Acharya as himself in the song "Chaandi ki daal par sone ka mor" (cameo appearance)

Music

Release and reception 
The film was dubbed and released in Telugu under the same name later that year.

Suparn Verma of Rediff.com wrote that "Hello Brother is a loud, garish film; it is funny, if you have an appetite for such fare".

References

External links
 

1999 films
1990s Hindi-language films
Films scored by Himesh Reshammiya
Films scored by Sajid–Wajid
Indian comedy horror films
Hindi remakes of Malayalam films
Indian ghost films
Indian horror film remakes